Uterovaginal plexus may refer to:
 Uterovaginal plexus (nerves)
 A compound structure consisting of the uterine venous plexus and vaginal venous plexus